Choropampa, The Price of Gold (Spanish: Choropampa, el precio del oro) is a 2002 Peruvian documentary film written and directed by Ernesto Cabellos and Stephanie Boyd in their directorial debut. The film tells of the struggle of the local Choropampa community to protect themselves from the large-scale exploitation of a gold mine.

Synopsis 
A devastating mercury spill by the world's richest gold mining corporation transforms a quiet peasant village in Peru's Andean mountains into a hot bed of civil resistance. A courageous young mayor emerges to lead his people on a quest for healthcare and justice. But powerful interests conspire to thwart the villagers at every turn in this 2-year epic chronicle of the real price of gold.

Reception 
Robert Koehler of Variety wrote: "In the best tradition of docu cinema, Choropampa, The Price of Gold expands on the immediate events it covers -- the aftermath of a June 2000 spill of toxic mercury in the Peruvian gold-mining town of Choropampa -- to ask larger questions about corporate and government responsibility in Third World regions rich in natural resources but poor in material wealth".

Awards

References

External links 

 

2002 films
2002 documentary films
Peruvian documentary films
2000s Spanish-language films
2000s Peruvian films
Films set in Peru
Films shot in Peru
2002 directorial debut films